The 1998 FIFA World Cup was the 16th FIFA World Cup, the football world championship for men's national teams. The finals tournament was held in France from 10 June to 12 July 1998. The country was chosen as the host nation by FIFA for the second time in the history of the tournament, defeating Morocco in the bidding process. It was the second time that France staged the competition (the first was in 1938) and the ninth time that it was held in Europe. Spanning 32 days, it is the longest World Cup tournament ever held.

Qualification for the finals began in March 1996 and concluded in November 1997. For the first time in the competition, the group stage was expanded from 24 teams to 32, with eight groups of four. 64 matches were played in 10 stadiums in 10 host cities, with the opening match and final staged at the newly built Stade de France in the Parisian commune of Saint-Denis.

The tournament was won by host country France, who beat defending champions Brazil 3–0 in the final. France won their first title, becoming the seventh nation to win a World Cup, and the sixth (after Uruguay, Italy, England, West Germany and Argentina) and as of 2022 the most recent to win the tournament on home soil. Croatia, Jamaica, Japan and South Africa made their first appearances in the finals.

Host selection 

France was awarded the 1998 World Cup on 2 July 1992 by the executive committee of FIFA during a general meeting in Zürich, Switzerland. They defeated Morocco by 12 votes to 7. Switzerland withdrew, due to being unable to meet FIFA's requirements. This made France the third country to host two World Cups, after Mexico and Italy in 1986 and 1990 respectively. France previously hosted the third edition of the World Cup in 1938. England, who hosted the competition in 1966 and won it, were among the original applicants, but later withdrew their application in favour of an ultimately successful bid to host UEFA Euro 1996.

Bribery and corruption investigations 

On 4 June 2015, while co-operating with the FBI and the Swiss authorities, Chuck Blazer confirmed that he and other members of FIFA's executive committee were bribed during the 1998 and 2010 World Cups host selection process. Blazer stated that "we facilitated bribes in conjunction with the selection of the host nation for the 1998 World Cup". Since France won the selection process it was initially thought the bribery came from its bid committee. It eventually transpired that the bribe payment was from the failed Moroccan bid.

Qualification 

The qualification draw for the 1998 World Cup finals took place in the Musée du Louvre, Paris on 12 December 1995. As tournament hosts, France was exempt from the draw as was defending champion Brazil, but it was also France's first World Cup since 1986. 174 teams from six confederations participated, 24 more than in the previous round. Fourteen countries qualified from the European zone (in addition to hosts France). Ten were determined after group play – nine group winners and the best second-placed team; the other eight group runners-up were drawn into pairs of four play-off matches with the winners qualifying for the finals as well. CONMEBOL (South America) and CAF (Africa) were each given five spots in the final tournament, while three spots were contested between 30 CONCACAF members in the North and Central America and the Caribbean zone. The winner of the Oceanian zone advanced to an intercontinental play-off against the runner-up of the Asian play-off, determined by the two best second-placed teams.

Four nations qualified for the first time: Croatia, Jamaica, Japan and South Africa. The last team to qualify was Iran by virtue of beating Australia in a two-legged tie on 29 November 1997. It marked their first appearance in the finals since 1978, the last time Tunisia also qualified for the tournament. Chile qualified for the first time since 1982, after serving a ban that saw them miss out on the two previous tournaments. Paraguay and Denmark returned for the first time since 1986. Austria, England, Scotland and Yugoslavia returned after missing out on the 1994 tournament, with the Balkan team now appearing under the name of FR Yugoslavia. Among the teams who failed to qualify were two-time winners Uruguay (for the second successive tournament); Portugal (their last absence as of 2022); Sweden, who finished third in 1994; Russia (who failed to qualify for the first time since 1978 after losing to Italy in the play-off round); and the Republic of Ireland, who had qualified for the previous two tournaments. The highest-ranked team not to qualify was the UEFA Euro 1996 runners-up the Czech Republic (ranked 3rd), while the lowest-ranked team that did qualify was Nigeria (ranked 74th).

As of 2022, this was the last time Austria, Bulgaria, Norway, Romania and Scotland qualified for a FIFA World Cup finals, and the only time Jamaica have qualified.

List of qualified teams 

The following 32 teams, shown with final pre-tournament rankings, qualified for the final tournament.

AFC (4)
  (42)
  (12)
  (34)
  (20)
CAF (5)
  (49)
  (13)
  (74)
  (24) 
  (21)
OFC (0)
 None qualified

CONCACAF (3)
  (30)
  (4)
  (11)
CONMEBOL (5)
  (6)
  (1)
  (9)
  (10)
  (29)

UEFA (15)
  (31)
  (36)
  (35)
  (19)
  (27)
  (5)
  (18) (hosts)
  (2)
  (14)
  (25)
  (7)
  (22)
  (41)
  (15)
  FR Yugoslavia (8)

Venues 
France's bid to host the World Cup centered on a national stadium with 80,000 seats and nine other stadiums located across the country. When the finals were originally awarded in July 1992, none of the regional club grounds were of a capacity meeting FIFA's requirements – namely being able to safely seat 40,000. The proposed national stadium, colloquially referred to as the 'Grand stade', met with controversy at every stage of planning; the stadium's location was determined by politics, finance and national symbolism. As Mayor of Paris, Jacques Chirac successfully negotiated a deal with Prime Minister Édouard Balladur to bring the Stade de France, as it was now called, to the commune of Saint-Denis just north of the capital city. Construction on the stadium started in December 1995 and was completed after 26 months of work in November 1997 at a cost of ₣2.67 billion.

The choice of stadium locations was drafted from an original list of 14 cities. FIFA and CFO monitored the progress and quality of preparations, culminating in the former providing final checks of the grounds weeks before the tournament commenced. Montpellier was the surprise inclusion from the final list of cities because of its low urban hierarchy in comparison to Strasbourg, who boasted a better hierarchy and success from its local football team, having been taken over by a consortium. Montpellier however was considered ambitious by the selecting panel to host World Cup matches. The local city and regional authorities in particular had invested heavily into football the previous two decades and were able to measure economic effects, in terms of jobs as early as in 1997. Some of the venues used for this tournament were also used for the previous World Cup in France in 1938. The Stade Vélodrome in Marseille, the Stade Municipal in Toulouse, the Gerland in Lyon, the Parc Lescure in Bordeaux and the Parc des Princes in Paris received the honour of hosting World Cup matches once again in 1998 as they had all done in 1938.

10 stadiums in total were used for the finals; in addition to nine matches being played at the Stade de France (the most used stadium in the tournament), a further six matches took place in Paris Saint-Germain's Parc des Princes, bringing Paris's total matches hosted to 15. France played four of their seven matches in the national stadium; they also played in the country's second and third largest cities, Marseille (hosting 7 total matches) and Lyon (hosting 6 total matches), as well as a Round of 16 knockout match in the northern city of Lens (also hosting 6 total matches). Nantes, Toulouse, Bordeaux, Montpellier and Saint-Etienne also hosted 6 matches in total; all of the stadiums used also hosted knockout round matches.

Innovations

Technologies 
This was the first FIFA World Cup where fourth officials used electronic boards, instead of cardboard.

Rule changes 
This was the first World Cup since the introduction of golden goals, banning of tackles from behind that endanger the safety of an opponent and allowance of three substitutions per game.

Match officials 
34 referees and 33 assistants officiated in the 1998 World Cup. As a result of the extension to 32 teams in the finals, there was an increase of 10 referees and 11 officials from the 1994 World Cup.

CAF (5)
  Said Belqola
  Gamal Al-Ghandour
  Lucien Bouchardeau
  Lim Kee Chong
  Ian McLeod

AFC (4)
  Abdul Rahman Al-Zaid
  Ali Bujsaim
  Masayoshi Okada
  Pirom Un-Prasert

UEFA (15)
  Marc Batta
  Günter Benkö
  Pierluigi Collina
  Hugh Dallas
  Paul Durkin
  José María García-Aranda
  Bernd Heynemann
  Nikolai Levnikov
  Urs Meier
  Vítor Melo Pereira
  Kim Milton Nielsen
  Rune Pedersen
  László Vágner
  Mario van der Ende
  Ryszard Wójcik

CONCACAF (3)
  Esfandiar Baharmast
  Arturo Brizio Carter
  Ramesh Ramdhan

OFC (1)
  Eddie Lennie

CONMEBOL (6)
  Javier Castrilli
  Epifanio González
  Márcio Rezende de Freitas
  Mario Sánchez Yanten
  Alberto Tejada Noriega
  John Toro Rendón

Draw 

The FIFA Organising Committee announced the eight seeded teams on 3 December 1997. The historic tradition to seed the hosts (France) and holders (Brazil) was upheld; while the remaining six seeds were granted for the other top7-ranked teams, based on their results obtained in the last three FIFA World Cups (ratio 3:2:1, counting in total 60%) and their FIFA World Ranking position in the last month of the past three years (equal ratio, counting in total 40%).

For the draw, the 32 teams were allocated into four pots. The eight top-seeded teams were allocated in pot A and would be drawn/selected into the first position of the eight groups playing in the group stage. The remaining 24 unseeded teams were allocated into three pots based on geographical sections, with the: Nine European teams in pot B; four Asian teams and three South American teams in pot C; five African teams and three North American teams in pot D.

The general principle was to draw one team from each pot into the eight groups, although with special combined procedures for pot B and pot C, due to comprising more/less than eight teams - but sixteen teams in total. At the same time, the draw also needed to respect the geographical limitation, that each group could not feature more than one team from each confederation, except for the European teams where the limitation was maximum two per group.

 The draw took place at Stade Vélodrome in Marseille, and was televised live on 4 December 1997: FIFA World Cup Draw on BBC Sport.
For the first time in history, the draw event took place in a football stadium, with 38,000 spectators and an estimated 1 billion TV viewers. The draw was officiated by FIFA secretary general Sepp Blatter. Teams were drawn by football legends Franz Beckenbauer, Carlos Alberto Parreira, George Weah and Raymond Kopa.

Organiser Michel Platini, who later became president of UEFA, admitted in 2018 that the draw for the group stage of the competition had been fixed so that France and Brazil were kept apart until the final, telling France Bleu Sport: "We did a bit of trickery. When we were organising the schedule. We did not spend six years organising the World Cup to not do some little shenanigans".

The statement from Platini referred to the fact that, shortly before the World Cup finals draw took place, the FIFA Organising Committee had met to finalise the draw process. At this meeting, the committee had approved the proposal to assign host nation France to group position C1 and defending champions Brazil to group position A1 ahead of the draw. As the tournament structure was also predetermined so that the winners of Groups A, D, E and H, and the runners-up of Groups B, C, F and G would be kept apart from the group winners of B, C, F and G, and the runners-up of Group A, D, E and H until the final; thus, France and Brazil could avoid meeting each other until the final if both teams finished in the same position in the top two of their respective groups.

Procedure for the draw:
 Pot A was used to draw the remaining six top-seeded teams for the first position of groups B, D, E, F, G and H.
 Pot D was used to draw one team to each of the eight groups (drawing in the alphabetic order from A to H).
 Pot B was used to draw one team to each of the eight groups (drawing in the alphabetic order from A to H).
 As per the FIFA rule of only allowing a maximum of two UEFA teams in each group, the remaining ninth team from Pot B, was subject to a second draw, to be put in either of the groups containing a top-seeded South American (CONMEBOL) team.
 Pot C was used to draw one team to each of the seven groups with an empty spot (drawing in alphabetical order from A to H). However, as each group could only contain one South American (CONMEBOL) team, the first Asian (AFC) team drawn would not be drawn into a group in alphabetical order, but instead be drawn into the remaining open group with a top-seeded South American (CONMEBOL) team.
 To decide the match schedules, the exact group position number for the un-seeded teams in each group (2, 3 or 4), were also drawn immediately from eight special group bowls, after each respective team had been drawn from pot D, B and C.

Draw results and group fixtures
The draw resulted in the following eight groups:

In each group, the teams played three matches, one against each of the other teams. Three points were awarded for each win, while a draw was worth one point. After completion of the group stage, the two teams with the most points in each group would advance to the knockout stage, with each group winner facing the runner-up from one of the other groups in the round of 16. This was a new format for the World Cup, following the expansion from 24 teams in 1994. A total of 64 games were played, including the final and a third-place play-off between the losers of the two semi-finals.

The fixtures for the group stage were decided based on the draw results, as follows:

Squads 

As with the preceding tournament, each team's squad for the 1998 World Cup finals consisted of 22 players. Each participating national association had to confirm their final 22-player squad by 1 June 1998.

Out of the 704 players participating in the 1998 World Cup, 447 were signed up with a European club; 90 in Asia, 67 in South America, 61 in Northern and Central America and 37 in Africa. 75 played their club football in England – five more than Italy and Spain. Barcelona of Spain was the club contributing to the most players in the tournament with 13 players on their side.

The average age of all teams was 27 years, 8 months – five months older than the previous tournament. Samuel Eto'o of Cameroon was the youngest player selected in the competition at 17 years, 3 months, while the oldest was Jim Leighton of Scotland at 39 years, 11 months.

Group stage 
 

All times are Central European Summer Time (UTC+2)

Group A

Defending champions Brazil won Group A after only two matches as the nation achieved victories over Scotland (2–1) and Morocco (3–0). Heading into the third game, Brazil had nothing to play for but still started its regulars against Norway, who was looking to upset Brazil once again. Needing a victory, Norway overturned a 1–0 deficit with 12 minutes remaining to defeat Brazil 2–1, with Kjetil Rekdal scoring the winning penalty to send Norway into the knockout stage for the first time.

Norway's victory denied Morocco a chance at the Round of 16, despite winning 3–0 against Scotland. It was only Morocco's second ever victory at a World Cup, having recorded its first previous win 12 years earlier on 11 June 1986.

Scotland managed only one point, coming in a 1–1 draw against Norway, and failed to get out of the first round for an eighth time in the FIFA World Cup, a record that stands to this date.

Group B

Italy and Chile progressed to the second round, while Austria failed to win for the first time since 1958 and Cameroon failed to get out of the group stage for the second time in a row.

Group C

France, the host nation, swept Group C when the start of their path to their first FIFA World Cup trophy culminated with their 2–1 win over Denmark, who despite their loss, progressed to the second round. Saudi Arabia, after a good performance four years earlier, finished bottom with only one point. Debutant South Africa grabbed two points and also exited at the group stage.

Group D

Nigeria and Paraguay advanced to the Round of 16 after a surprise elimination of top seed Spain, while Bulgaria failed to repeat their surprise performance from the previous tournament.

Group E

The Netherlands and Mexico advanced with the same record, with the former placing first on goal difference. Belgium and eventual 2002 FIFA World Cup co-hosts South Korea failed to advance.

Group F

Germany and the Federal Republic of Yugoslavia advanced, each with 7 points (Germany took 1st through goal differential tiebreak). Iran and 1994 host United States failed to advance.

Group G

Romania surprisingly topped the group over England, while Colombia and Tunisia were unable to reach the last 16, despite Colombia having one win.

Group H

Argentina finished at the top of Group H against three debutants. Croatia took the runners up spot while the surprising Jamaica, and Japan failed to advance.

Knockout stage 

The knockout stage comprised the 16 teams that advanced from the group stage of the tournament. For each game in the knockout stage, any draw at 90 minutes was followed by 30 minutes of extra time; if scores were still level, there was a penalty shoot-out to determine who progressed to the next round. Golden goal comes into play if a team scores during extra time, thus becoming the winner which concludes the game.

Round of 16

Quarter-finals 
The Quarter-finals were Brazil vs Denmark, Italy vs France, Netherlands vs Argentina and Germany vs Croatia, in which Croatia surprisingly won 3-0.

Semi-finals

Third place play-off 
Croatia beat the Netherlands to earn third place in the competition. Davor Šuker scored the winner in the 36th minute to secure the golden boot.

Final 

The final was held on 12 July 1998 at the Stade de France, Saint-Denis. France defeated holders Brazil 3–0, with two goals from Zinedine Zidane and a stoppage time strike from Emmanuel Petit. The win gave France their first World Cup title, becoming the sixth national team after Uruguay, Italy, England, West Germany and Argentina to win the tournament on their home soil. They also inflicted the second-heaviest World Cup defeat on Brazil, later to be topped by Brazil's 7–1 defeat by Germany in the semi-finals of the 2014 FIFA World Cup.

The pre-match build up was dominated by the omission of Brazilian striker Ronaldo from the starting lineup only to be reinstated 45 minutes before kick-off. He managed to create the first open chance for Brazil in the 22nd minute, dribbling past defender Thuram before sending a cross out on the left side that goalkeeper Fabien Barthez struggled to hold onto. France however took the lead after Brazilian defender Roberto Carlos conceded a corner from which Zidane scored via a header. Three minutes before half-time, Zidane scored his second goal of the match, similarly another header from a corner. The tournament hosts went down to ten men in the 68th minute as Marcel Desailly was sent off for a second bookable offence. Brazil reacted to this by making an attacking substitution and although they applied pressure France sealed the win with a third goal: substitute Patrick Vieira set up his club teammate Petit in a counterattack to shoot low past goalkeeper Cláudio Taffarel.

French president Jacques Chirac was in attendance to congratulate and commiserate the winners and runners-up respectively after the match. Several days after the victory, winning manager Aimé Jacquet announced his resignation from the French team with immediate effect.

Statistics

Goalscorers 
Davor Šuker received the Golden Boot for scoring six goals. In total, 171 goals were scored by 112 players:

6 goals
  Davor Šuker

5 goals
  Gabriel Batistuta
  Christian Vieri

4 goals
  Ronaldo
  Marcelo Salas
  Luis Hernández

3 goals

  Bebeto
  César Sampaio
  Rivaldo
  Thierry Henry
  Oliver Bierhoff
  Jürgen Klinsmann
  Dennis Bergkamp

2 goals

  Ariel Ortega
  Marc Wilmots
  Robert Prosinečki
  Brian Laudrup
  Michael Owen
  Alan Shearer
  Emmanuel Petit
  Lilian Thuram
  Zinedine Zidane
  Roberto Baggio
  Theodore Whitmore
  Ricardo Peláez
  Salaheddine Bassir
  Abdeljalil Hadda
  Phillip Cocu
  Ronald de Boer
  Patrick Kluivert
  Viorel Moldovan
  Shaun Bartlett
  Fernando Hierro
  Fernando Morientes
  Slobodan Komljenović

1 goal

  Claudio López
  Mauricio Pineda
  Javier Zanetti
  Andreas Herzog
  Toni Polster
  Ivica Vastić
  Luc Nilis
  Emil Kostadinov
  Patrick M'Boma
  Pierre Njanka
  José Luis Sierra
  Léider Preciado
  Robert Jarni
  Mario Stanić
  Goran Vlaović
  Thomas Helveg
  Martin Jørgensen
  Michael Laudrup
  Peter Møller
  Allan Nielsen
  Marc Rieper
  Ebbe Sand
  Darren Anderton
  David Beckham
  Paul Scholes
  Laurent Blanc
  Youri Djorkaeff
  Christophe Dugarry
  Bixente Lizarazu
  David Trezeguet
  Andreas Möller
  Mehdi Mahdavikia
  Hamid Estili
  Luigi Di Biagio
  Robbie Earle
  Masashi Nakayama
  Cuauhtémoc Blanco
  Alberto García Aspe
  Mustapha Hadji
  Edgar Davids
  Marc Overmars
  Pierre van Hooijdonk
  Boudewijn Zenden
  Mutiu Adepoju
  Tijani Babangida
  Victor Ikpeba
  Sunday Oliseh
  Wilson Oruma
  Dan Eggen
  Håvard Flo
  Tore André Flo
  Kjetil Rekdal
  Celso Ayala
  Miguel Ángel Benítez
  José Cardozo
  Adrian Ilie
  Dan Petrescu
  Sami Al-Jaber
  Yousuf Al-Thunayan
  Craig Burley
  John Collins
  Benni McCarthy
  Ha Seok-ju
  Yoo Sang-chul
  Kiko
  Luis Enrique
  Raúl
  Skander Souayah
  Brian McBride
  Siniša Mihajlović
  Predrag Mijatović
  Dragan Stojković

Own goals

  Georgi Bachev (against Spain)
  Youssef Chippo (against Norway)
  Tom Boyd (against Brazil)
  Pierre Issa (against France)
  Andoni Zubizarreta (against Nigeria)
  Siniša Mihajlović (against Germany)

Awards

Players who were red-carded during the tournament 

  Ariel Ortega
  Gert Verheyen
  Anatoli Nankov
  Raymond Kalla
  Lauren
  Rigobert Song
  Miklos Molnar
  Morten Wieghorst
  David Beckham
  Laurent Blanc
  Marcel Desailly
  Zinedine Zidane
  Christian Wörns
  Darryl Powell
  Ha Seok-ju
  Pável Pardo
  Ramón Ramírez
  Patrick Kluivert
  Arthur Numan
  Mohammed Al-Khilaiwi
  Craig Burley
  Alfred Phiri

All-star team 
The All-star team is a squad consisting of the 16 most impressive players at the 1998 World Cup, as selected by FIFA's Technical Study Group.

Final standings 
After the tournament, FIFA published a ranking of all teams that competed in the 1998 World Cup finals based on progress in the competition and overall results.

Marketing

Broadcasting 
 

FIFA, through several companies, sold the broadcasting rights for the 1998 FIFA World Cup to many broadcasters. In the UK BBC and ITV had the broadcasting rights.
The pictures and audio of the competition were supplied to the TV and radio channels by the company TVRS 98, the broadcaster of the tournament.

The World Cup matches were broadcast in 200 countries. 818 photographers were credited for the tournament. In every match, a stand was reserved for the press. The number of places granted to them reached its maximum in the final, when 1,750 reporters and 110 TV commentators were present in the stand.

Sponsorship 

The sponsors of the 1998 FIFA World Cup are divided into two categories: FIFA World Cup Sponsors and France Supporters.

The absence of Budweiser (which was one of the sponsors in the previous two World Cups) is notable due to the Evin law, which forbids alcohol-related sponsorship in France, including in sports events (and thus, being replaced by Casio).

Video games 
In most of the world, the official video game was, World Cup 98 released by EA Sports on 13 March 1998 for Microsoft Windows, PlayStation, Nintendo 64 and the Game Boy. It was the first international football game developed by Electronic Arts since obtaining the rights from FIFA in 1997 and received mostly favourable reviews.

In Japan, Konami was granted the FIFA World Cup licence and produced two distinct video games: Jikkyou World Soccer: World Cup France 98 by KCEO for the Nintendo 64, and World Soccer Jikkyou Winning Eleven 3: World Cup France '98 by KCET for the PlayStation. These games were released in the rest of the world as International Superstar Soccer '98 and International Superstar Soccer Pro '98, without the official FIFA World Cup licence, branding or real player names.

Also in Japan, Sega was granted the FIFA World Cup licence to produce the Saturn video game World Cup '98 France: Road to Win.

Many other video games, including World League Soccer 98, Actua Soccer 2 and Neo Geo Cup '98: The Road to the Victory were released in the buildup to the 1998 World Cup and evidently were based on the tournament. FIFA: Road to World Cup 98, also by EA Sports focused on the qualification stage.

Symbols

Mascot 
The official mascot was Footix, a rooster first presented in May 1996. It was created by graphic designer Fabrice Pialot and selected from a shortlist of five mascots. Research carried out about the choice of having a cockerel as a mascot was greatly received: 91% associated it immediately with France, the traditional symbol of the nation. Footix, the name chosen by French television viewers, is a portmanteau of "football" and the ending "-ix" from the popular Astérix comic strip. The mascot's colours reflect those of the host nation's flag and home strip – blue for the jump suit, a red crest and with the words 'France 98' coloured in white.

Match ball 

The official match ball for the 1998 World Cup, manufactured by Adidas was named the Tricolore, meaning 'three-coloured' in French. It was the eighth World Cup match ball made for the tournament by the German company and was the first in the series to be multi-coloured. The tricolour flag and cockerel, traditional symbols of France, were used as inspiration for the design.

Music 

The official song of the 1998 FIFA World Cup was "The Cup of Life", also known as "La Copa de la Vida", recorded by Ricky Martin.

The official anthem was "La Cour des Grands (Do You Mind If I Play)" by Youssou N'Dour and Axelle Red.

Legacy 
Honorary FIFA President João Havelange praised France's hosting of the World Cup, describing the tournament as one that would "remain with me forever, as I am sure they will remain with everyone who witnessed this unforgettable competition". Lennart Johansson, the chairman of the organising committee for the World Cup and President of UEFA added that France provided "subject matter of a quality that made the world hold its breath".

Cour des Comptes, the quasi-judicial body of the French government, released its report on the organisation of the 1998 World Cup in 2000.

See also 

 Music of the World Cup: Allez! Ola! Ole! – The Official 1998 FIFA World Cup music album
 1998 World Cup terror plot

References

Sources

External links 

  
 1998 FIFA World Cup France, FIFA.com
 RSSSF Archive of finals
 RSSSF Archive of qualifying rounds
  at the BBC

 
FIFA World Cup tournaments
International association football competitions hosted by France
FIFA World Cup
FIFA World Cup
FIFA World Cup
1998 in association football